Burton Adventist Academy is a co-educational private Christian school in Arlington, Texas, United States. It covers the grades from pre-kindergarten through twelfth grade. Burton is associated with the Seventh-day Adventist Church and is part of the Seventh-day Adventist education system. It offers a basic high school diploma, advanced diploma, and honors diploma.

Curriculum
The school curriculum consists primarily of the standard courses taught at college preparatory schools across the world. All students are required to take classes in the core areas of English, Basic Sciences, Mathematics, a Foreign Language, and Social Sciences.

Spiritual aspects
All students take religion classes each year that they are enrolled.

See also

 List of Seventh-day Adventist secondary schools
 Seventh-day Adventist education

References

External links
 

Christian schools in Texas
Adventist secondary schools in the United States
Private K-12 schools in Texas
Educational institutions established in 1911
1911 establishments in Texas